Taipaleti Kakato Tuʻuta (born circa 1964) is a Tongan former rugby union player. He played as flanker.

Career
Tuʻuta first played for the 'Ikale Tahi during the 1987 Rugby World Cup, in the first match against Canada, in Napier, on 24 May 1987. He also played the other two matches in the tournament. His last cap for Tonga was on 25 July 1992, against Fiji, in Nuku'alofa, earning 8 caps and 0 points.

References

External links
Taipaleti Tu'uta international stats

1964 births
Living people
Tongan rugby union players
Rugby union flankers
Tonga international rugby union players